The Box is a new wave group from Montreal, Quebec. Founded in 1981, they achieved commercial success in Canada, recording four charting albums and 10 charting singles between 1984 and 1990. The group broke up in 1992, but a new line-up was founded in 2005.  This iteration of the group has released two further albums.

Biography
The band was formed in 1981 by Jean-Marc Pisapia, an early member of Men Without Hats. He recruited guitarist Guy Florent and bassist Jean-Pierre Brie and, before they settled on calling themselves The Box, the group was known as Checkpoint Charlie.

The band's first single attracted the attention of Montreal radio station CKOI-FM, leading to a deal with Alert Records. Also that year, Jean-Marc's brother Guy Pisapia joined on keyboards.

Their debut album The Box was released in 1984 and produced the hit singles Must I Always Remember and Walk Away. Drummer Sylvain Coutu joined the band for its supporting tour, but was replaced by Pierre Taillefer before the next album. Florent also left and was replaced by Claude Thibeault.

In 1985, The Box released All the Time, All the Time, All the Time. That album, which included backing vocals by Sass Jordan and Marie Carmen, produced the hit singles My Dreams of You and L'Affaire Dumoutier (Say to Me). They won the 1985 Félix Award for group of the year, and were nominated for the 1985 Juno Award for Most Promising Group of the Year.

1987's Closer Together was the band's most commercially successful album. Featuring the hit singles "Ordinary People", "Closer Together" and "Crying Out Loud for Love", the album was certified platinum. Backing vocals on the album were provided by Jordan and Martine St. Clair. The band's biggest hit, "Closer Together", was originally commissioned for a fundraiser for a anti-leukemia foundation. 

After touring for more than eighteen months, the band took six months off to recover before returning with 1990's The Pleasure and the Pain. That album was a commercial disappointment, and The Box disbanded in 1992 after releasing the greatest hits compilation A Decade of Box Music.

Pisapia released a solo album, John of Mark, in 1995. This was later reissued as a Box album in 2015.

Pisapia revived The Box with a new lineup in 2004, issuing two new Box tracks (recorded in 1996 and 2002) on a new hits compilation, Always in Touch With You. This version of The Box was essentially Pisapia backed by session musicians, but the line-up soon coalesced into steady group that had a decidedly more prog-rock orientation than the original incarnation of the band.

In 2005, the band released Black Dog There, its first new album in 15 years. This was followed up by the 2009 album D'Après le horla de Maupassant (or simply Le Horla for short), the first Box album sung entirely in French.

By the 2010s, the music industry had changed so much that Pisapia felt no need to create entire albums. "Back in the 80s, it was very simple... Today, even the most experienced executive in a record company doesn’t know where to start." Pisapia had begun painting, but still had his own recording studio for when he got "the urge" to make music. The Box released several singles (in both English and French) and a four song EP, Take Me Home during this decade.

Discography

Singles

Albums

Original studio albums

† Originally issued as by "John of Mark"; reissued by The Box in 2015.

Compilation albums
 A Decade of Box Music (1992)
 Always in Touch with You: The Best of the Box (2003)
 ''The Best Of The Box (2007) CD + DVD

References

External links
 

Musical groups established in 1981
Musical groups disestablished in 1992
Musical groups reestablished in 2002
Musical groups from Montreal
Canadian new wave musical groups
Canadian pop rock music groups
English-language musical groups from Quebec
1981 establishments in Quebec
1992 disestablishments in Quebec
2002 establishments in Quebec
Westpark Music artists
Capitol Records artists
Universal Music Group artists